Topia Peehi Turoa (died 1903) was a notable New Zealand tribal leader. Of Māori descent, he identified with the Te Ati Haunui-a-Paparangi iwi. He was the grandson of Te Peehi Turoa.

References

Te Āti Haunui-a-Pāpārangi people
Year of birth missing
1903 deaths